Mikel Ndubusi Agu (born 27 May 1993) is a Nigerian professional footballer who plays as defensive midfielder or a  centre back for Japanese side Shonan Bellmare.

Club career

Early career
Mikel Agu started his career with grassroots team Megapp FC in Nigeria. He took part in the 2009 Copa Coca-Cola, where he was chosen as the best player of the tournament, attracting the interest of scouts. After the tournament, Agu joined the youth academy of Porto.

Porto 
Agu was first signed under the Porto-U 19 setup training with the senior team with the occasional bench appearance. His development would see him play 2 seasons for Porto B before eventually getting an opportunity to play for the first team. Agu made his debut against Gil Vicente in a 2-1 win coming as a substitute for Josué. Doing so, he became the first Nigerian to play for the club. Following his wonderful performance in Porto B, the then manager Paulo Fonseca promoted him to the main team. He would then be sent on loan to gain experience playing in the first division.

Seeking playing opportunities at Porto, Agu was deployed mostly in the Porto B team, with whom he made 69 league appearances between 2012 and 2016. He completed over 30 appearances in each of the 2012–13 and 20–2014 seasons.

Loans 
At the start of 2015/2016 season, after making one appearance for Porto B, he went on loan to Club Brugge in the Belgian Jupiler league. He made just two league appearances as Brugge finished the season as league champions.

Agu was loaned back to the Portuguese league for the 2016–17 season, which served somewhat as a breakout season for him. He made 27 league appearances, starting 25 times; and 34 total appearances in all competitions for Vitória de Setúbal He played a part as they made a run to the semi-final in the Taça da Liga. His much improved game-play ensured that he was finally recognized as a top player within his own right. His performances were also noticed by his country's national team, leading to a call-up in 2017. This decision was made that he would be recalled to the Porto first team at the end of the season.

In August 2017, Agu joined Turkish side Bursaspor on a season-long loan deal. He then spent the 2018–19 campaign on loan at former side Vitória de Setúbal before leaving Porto permanently in 2019.

Vitória de Guimarães
On 18 July 2019, Agu signed a three-year contract with Vitória de Guimarães. After featuring sparingly in his first two years, he was separated from the squad ahead of the 2021–22 season, and terminated his contract on 15 January 2022.

Fuenlabrada
On 15 January 2022, just hours after leaving Vitória, Agu moved to Spain and signed a short-term deal with CF Fuenlabrada in Segunda División.

Shonan Bellmare
In September 2022, he signed with Japanese side Shonan Bellmare.

International career
He was selected by Nigeria for their 35-man provisional squad for the 2016 Summer Olympics. Agu made his senior debut for Nigeria in a 3-0 friendly win over Togo on 1 June 2017.

In May 2018 he was named in Nigeria’s  preliminary 30 man squad for the 2018 World Cup in Russia. However, he did not make the final 23.

Style of play
Agu's style of play can be likened to former Chelsea player John Obi Mikel. He received the nickname "Mikel" from fans in Benin City, where he grew up, due to similarities in movement and overall play. He has an excellent close-control and has shown a very good passing range, complementing this with the vision to play long balls from the back. On occasion, he has shown the ability to control the tempo of the game. Defensively, he shows good anticipation and does not rush into his tackles, positioning himself just in front of the back four.

Honours

Club
Club Brugge
Belgian Pro League: 2015–16
Belgian Cup: Runner-up 2015–16

Individual
Tournament MVP Copa Coca-Cola, 2009

References

External links

1993 births
Living people
Nigerian footballers
Nigeria international footballers
Nigerian expatriate footballers
FC Porto players
FC Porto B players
Club Brugge KV players
Vitória F.C. players
Vitória S.C. players
CF Fuenlabrada footballers
Primeira Liga players
Liga Portugal 2 players
Belgian Pro League players
Expatriate footballers in Belgium
Expatriate footballers in Portugal
Expatriate footballers in Spain
Nigerian expatriate sportspeople in Belgium
Nigerian expatriate sportspeople in Portugal
Nigerian expatriate sportspeople in Spain
Association football midfielders
Sportspeople from Delta State